The Universidad Casa Blanca (commonly known as UCB, English: "Casa Blanca University"), is a private arts and design university located in Culiacán, Sinaloa, Mexico. It is one of the state's preeminent institutions of higher learning and one of the best design,(graphic design, architecture, interior design, fashion design, industrial design) and marketing schools in Sinaloa, Mexico.

External links
 Official site

Universities and colleges in Sinaloa
Educational institutions established in 1990
1990 establishments in Mexico